Harrogate (Brunswick) railway station served the town of Harrogate, North Yorkshire, England from 1848 to 1862 on the Leeds and Thirsk Railway.

History 
The station, named after the nearby Brunswick Hotel, opened on 20 July 1848 by the Leeds and Thirsk Railway. The station was situated on the north side of Trinity Road, where Trinity Methodist Church now stands. There were two sidings to the west, one serving a small engine shed. When the North Eastern Railway opened the current  station, this station was considered obsolete and closed on 1 August 1862; it was going to be retained for goods traffic but this idea was short-lived.

The tunnel which formerly served the station still exists, running from a branch just north of Hornbeam Park railway station up toward St Mark's Church, Harrogate. The tunnel was used as an air raid shelter during World War II, and steps leading up to the surface were constructed at the now closed north end of the tunnel, near St Mark's Road.

References

External links 

Disused railway stations in North Yorkshire
Railway stations in Great Britain opened in 1848
Railway stations in Great Britain closed in 1862
1848 establishments in England
Former York and North Midland Railway stations